Rob the Robot is a preschool computer-animated television series. The series is a co-production between Amberwood Entertainment and Singapore's One Animation and was commissioned by Canada's TVOntario, British Columbia's Knowledge Network, CBC's Radio Canada Television, and Access. It also airs on Australia's Seven Network and ABC Me in Brisbane (BTQ-7 Brisbane), and is currently on America's Vme Kids. The series debuted in 2010.

Plot
The series revolves around four young friends flying around the Robot Galaxy in a spaceship to different planets to solve various tasks.

Characters
The main characters are:
Rob (voiced by Stacey DePass), a curious and adventurous metal robot. In the French version, he is named Robin. 
Ema (voiced by Camden Angelis), is a cute and smart linguist. 
TK (voiced by Jordi Mand), is a kind robot. She always has a smile.
Orbit (voiced by Jake Beale), an artist robot with two bandages taped to the back of his head.
Mission Control (voiced by John Stocker)

Episodes

References

2010s Canadian animated television series
2010 Canadian television series debuts
2017 Canadian television series endings
Canadian computer-animated television series
Canadian children's animated comic science fiction television series
Canadian children's animated space adventure television series
Canadian children's animated science fantasy television series
Canadian preschool education television series
English-language television shows
Animated television series about robots
Animated television series about extraterrestrial life
TVO original programming
Amberwood Entertainment
Animated preschool education television series
2010s preschool education television series